The Chevrolet Citation is a range of compact cars that was produced by the Chevrolet division of General Motors. The first Chevrolet sold with front-wheel drive, a single generation of the Citation was sold from the 1980 to 1985 model years. The successor of the Chevrolet Nova, the Citation was initially slotted between the Chevrolet Monza and the Chevrolet Malibu in the Chevrolet product line, later replaced by the Chevrolet Cavalier and the Chevrolet Celebrity.

The Citation was built on the second-generation compact GM X-platform. For 1980, GM had significantly revised its design, adopting a front-wheel drive layout and significantly decreasing it in size; while directly replacing the Nova, the all-new Citation bore an exterior footprint sized between the subcompact Chevrolet Monza and Chevrolet Vega. Sold alongside the Pontiac Phoenix, Buick Skylark, and Oldsmobile Omega, the Citation was offered in three body styles, including three-door and five-door hatchbacks and a two-door notchback coupe. The 2-door coupe style was similar to but had a distinctive roofline from the Phoenix, Skylark, and Omega, while the 3-door hatchback was exclusive to the Citation. The 5-door hatchback style was shared with the Phoenix, while a 4-door sedan style was offered only on the Skylark and Omega. Alongside a standard trim level, Chevrolet offered the Citation X-11, offering performance-oriented upgrades.

The Chevrolet Citation was assembled in the United States and Mexico alongside the Buick Skylark, Oldsmobile Omega, and Pontiac Phoenix by North Tarrytown Assembly (North Tarrytown, New York), Oklahoma City Assembly (Oklahoma City, Oklahoma), and Ramos Arizpe Assembly (Ramos Arizpe, Mexico). Following the 1985 model year, the Citation was discontinued by Chevrolet and its compact model range was replaced by the Chevrolet Beretta two-door coupe and Chevrolet Corsica four-door sedan/five-door hatchback. In total, Chevrolet manufactured 1,642,587 examples of the model line during its production run.

Development 
To better compete in the compact segment following the 1973 fuel crisis, General Motors commenced work in April 1974 on a replacement for its X-body compact lines, which included the Chevrolet Nova and its divisional counterparts. As the 1970s progressed, front wheel drive import-brand compact cars (such as the Honda Accord, and the Volkswagen Rabbit) continued to grow in popularity, gaining sales from domestic counterparts. While far smaller than the Nova (or even the subcompact Vega) in exterior footprint, the usage of a transverse front-wheel drive configuration expanded interior room. For 1978, Chrysler introduced the Dodge Omni and Plymouth Horizon; adopting much of the layout of the Volkswagen Rabbit (to the point of sourcing engines from Volkswagen), the five-door hatchbacks became the best-selling Chrysler model lines.

While GM had produced front-wheel drive vehicles since 1966, its experience with the powertrain configuration involved large personal luxury coupes (the Cadillac Eldorado and Oldsmobile Toronado) and recreational vehicles (the GMC Motorhome), neither compact nor fuel-efficient. Following the reverse-engineering of Lancia vehicles, GM selected a transverse front-wheel drive layout as it downsized the X-body. Chevrolet was responsible for the front suspension design, with Pontiac to develop the rear suspension. During the summer of 1976, the first X-body prototypes entered testing.

Intended for a 1978 model release, Chevrolet sought to retire the Nova nameplate, renaming its X-body line as the Chevrolet Condor. As GM shifted the downsizing of the A-body mid-size line to 1978, it shifted the launch of the X-body to an early 1980 release, as GM parts suppliers tried to accommodate large-scale production of a front-wheel drive vehicle. During the delay, Chevrolet withdrew the Condor nameplate in favor of Chevrolet Citation.

History 
The first front-wheel drive Chevrolet, the Chevrolet Citation served as the direct replacement for the Chevrolet Nova as the Chevrolet compact model line. In line with the 1977 Chevrolet Impala/Caprice and the 1978 Malibu and Monte Carlo, the Citation was downsized over its predecessor. While packaged with similar interior space as the mid-size Malibu (and trunk space as the Impala), the Citation was far smaller than its 1979 Nova predecessor, shedding 20 inches of length (an inch longer than the Vega), 4 inches of width, and 800 pounds of curb weight.

Through its production, as one of the front-wheel drive X-body vehicles, the Chevrolet Citation would undergo a number of manufacturer recalls. In 1980, 225,000 examples were recalled to fix a transmission hose related to underhood fires. The X-body cars (which included the Citation) were the target of an unsuccessful lawsuit by the U.S. National Highway Traffic Safety Administration (NHTSA), which cited a tendency for the vehicles to lose control under heavy braking, and power steering problems.

1980 

In April 1979, the Citation was released as a 1980 model in two trim levels. Alongside the standard trim, a sporty X-11 version was produced.

Priced under US$6,000 ($ in  dollars ), with hatchbacks in a much larger package than the Dodge Omni/Plymouth Horizon, demand proved very high for the Citation. Helped by an April release and yet another gasoline shortage during the same time, over 800,000 Citations were sold by Chevrolet for the model year. However, as the second gas crisis created demand for more fuel-efficient vehicles, GM was left with significant shortages of 4-cylinder engines, leaving some customers to wait several months to receive their vehicles. Before the fuel crisis, Chevrolet had anticipated 70% of customers purchasing the V6 engine option, leading to production lines unable to keep up with demand for four-cylinder models.

In an extended 1980 model year, Chevrolet would sell over 810,000 examples of the Citation; in addition to making for one of the most successful product launches in General Motors history, the Chevrolet Citation would become the best-selling car in the United States in 1980.

1981 
For 1981, following its successful model launch, the only visible external change that the Citation received was a somewhat larger grid pattern for its front "eggcrate" grill and amber rear turn-signals. Otherwise there were no visible external changes. The two-door coupe was dropped from the model line (in response to slow sales) with all Citation models offered as hatchbacks. The X-11 model now offered a more powerful engine than other Citation models, including a 135 hp "high output" 2.8L V6.

In the compact market segment, the Citation and the rest of the GM X-car line saw the introduction of their closest competitor, the Dodge Aries/Plymouth Reliant (the Chrysler K-Cars). Marking the transition of front-wheel drive for Chrysler, the K-Cars offered notchback sedan and station wagon models that were unavailable in the Citation line.

1982 

For 1982, the Citation underwent a minor exterior revision, replacing the eggcrate grille with a horizontally-slatted design (similar to the Malibu). Multiple upgrades were phased in to improve both drivability and fuel economy, with the 2.5L engine receiving fuel injection and low rolling-resistance tires were added to all Citations (including the X-11).

As a running change during the model year, the two-door Citation made its return after its temporary withdrawal.

During the model year, Chevrolet introduced two front-wheel drive model lines that would significantly affect demand for the Citation. Replacing the Monza, the J-body Chevrolet Cavalier subcompact offered its own coupe, hatchback, sedan, and station wagons configurations. Phased in to replace the Malibu, the A-body Chevrolet Celebrity was offered as a sedan and station wagon; technically a mid-size car, the Celebrity shared its chassis (including its wheelbase) with the Citation). This was also the year the first generation, front wheel drive Toyota Camry hatchback and sedan were introduced.

1983 
For 1983, the model line saw few changes to the exterior, concentrating most updates on the interior. Coinciding with the introduction of the larger Celebrity, the full-width bench seat was deleted, with all examples receiving bucket seats with head restraints. In a smaller change, the dashboard underwent minor updates.

Originally offered only on the X-11, the "HO" V6 was offered for all vehicles.

1984 

For 1984, the Citation was renamed the Citation II. While undergoing almost no visible changes outside of badging, the rebranding was intended to draw attention away from previous recalls and quality issues. All three body styles remained, along with the X-11.

For the first time, Citation sales increased over the previous year (though remaining under 100,000).

1985 
For 1985, the Citation II saw several revisions in its final year of production. The two-door Citation II was discontinued, though the X-11 remained. The dashboard underwent a redesign with a horizontally-mounted radio and a new steering wheel. The 2.8L HO engine became fuel injected (reducing output to 130 hp).

Powertrain
In addition to the X platform, GM also created a new line of engines for the Citation and its sisters. The 2.8 L LE2 V6 was the first of the 60°Family of engines. The X platform was used in 1982 as the basis for the new front-wheel drive A-body cars. The X platform was also the basis for the future L-body and N-body cars.

Citation X-11

Produced as a separate trim level, the Citation X-11 was a variant featuring cosmetic, chassis, and powertrain upgrades over the standard Citation. While less powerful than the Camaro Z28 (and later Monte Carlo SS), the Citation X-11 would also take over the role of the similarly sized Chevrolet Monza. The X-11 was offered throughout the production run of the Citation/Citation II, on the 3-door hatchback and 2-door "club coupe" (discontinued in 1981 and 1985).

In 1981, the Citation X-11 accelerated from 0–60 MPH in 8.5 seconds; the 1982–1984 version accelerated from 0–60 MPH in 9.2 seconds.

Chassis upgrades 
At its 1980 launch, the chassis of the Citation X-11 was upgraded with front and rear stabilizer bars and a retuned sport suspension, which were kept throughout its production. In place of steel wheels, the X-11 featured 13-inch rallye rims with Goodyear P205/70R-13 white-letter tires. In 1981, the 13-inch wheels were replaced with 14-inch wheels with Goodyear Eagle GT P215/60 R14 radial tires. To upgrade handling, for 1982, the steering rack was relocated from the firewall to the subframe holding the engine and front suspension. The design change was intended to prevent subframe movement from affecting steering behavior.

For 1980, the X-11 offered only handling upgrades over a Citation, with the powertrain consisting of a 90 hp 2.5L inline-4 and a 115 hp 2.8L V6. Alongside the standard Citation, the X-11 was available with either a 4-speed overdrive manual transmission or a 3-speed automatic transmission (the only transmission available for 1985).

To aid acceleration, axle ratios of the X-11 were changed, alongside the transmission gearing. A taller first gear was intended to allow the X-11 to accelerate to 60 mph without shifting to third gear. For 1981, the X-11 was powered exclusively by a "high-output" version of the 2.8L V6; a higher-performance dual-tip exhaust system raised output to 135 hp/165 lb-ft of torque. As before, the X-11 maintained separate final-drive ratios. In 1982, emissions regulations required a decrease in torque output, to 145 lb-ft (horsepower remained unchanged). This output remained the same through 1984. In 1985, the carbureted engine was replaced by a fuel-injected version of the 2.8L V6 with output decreased to 130 hp/155 lb-ft of torque. In slightly different tuning, the Citation X-11 shared its powertrain with the Chevrolet Celebrity Eurosport, Pontiac 6000STE, and Pontiac Fiero.

Body upgrades 
In 1980, the Citation X-11 shared most of its powertrain with the standard Citation, with the model being mostly a chassis and visual upgrade. Alongside the alloy wheels and tires, the X-11 featured a trunklid spoiler, sport mirrors, body skirting, and side striping. In 1981, to better distinguish the model from standard two-tone Citations, the side striping of the X-11 was replaced in favor of large "X-11" door graphic, which remained in use for the rest of its production. The model is best distinguished from a standard Citation by its use of a black grille (the only exterior chrome trim on a Citation II X-11 is the Chevrolet grille bowtie and trunklid badging). In 1981, a functional cowl-induction hood scoop was added. Under hard acceleration, a solenoid operated switch opened a flap that let in extra air.

While produced without the front bench seat seen in the launch of the Citation, the interior of the X-11 was most widely differentiated with the use of a sport steering wheel. The X-11 was produced with its own instrument panel, which featured a full set of engine gauges (6000 RPM tachometer for 1980, 7000 RPM tachometer for 1981–1985).

Racing 
The SCCA classified the X-11 in Showroom Stock B class. Bob McConnell drove a 1981 X-11 to SSB National Championships in 1982 and 1984.

Reception 
The Chevrolet Citation was awarded Motor Trend Car of the Year for 1980. In 2009, the editorial staff of Car and Driver criticized the 1980 Motor Trend decision (alongside several other vehicle awards), citing poor build quality and mechanical reliability undeserving of such an award in hindsight.

Car and Driver, along with several other car magazines of the time, were duped when GM lent them specially modified versions of the X-body vehicles in which heavy torque steer had been engineered out (torque steer was a handling trait common to X-platform vehicles). Patrick Bedard of Car and Driver said that they were completely surprised by this when they drove a production version some time later. Like the other X-body cars, the Citation was plagued by numerous reports of a tendency to lock the rear wheels upon braking, causing loss of control and crash.

Hagerty, an insurance company specializing in classic cars, notes that the X-car was "GM’s prime contender for one of the malaziest [sic] cars" of the Malaise era, a car that did "enormous damage to GM’s reputation, putting together a most unenviable record for recalls and poor quality control."

Sales 
Production Figures:

References

External links 
 

1980s cars
Cars introduced in 1979
Citation
Compact cars
Coupés
Front-wheel-drive vehicles
Hatchbacks
Motor vehicles manufactured in the United States
Cars discontinued in 1985